Cercocarpus betuloides is a shrub or small tree in the rose family. Its common names include  mountain mahogany and birch leaf mountain mahogany The common name "mahogany" comes from the hardness and color of the wood, although the genus is not a true mahogany.

Range and habitat
The plant is native to California, Baja California, Oregon, Arizona, and northwestern New Mexico. It typically grows in summer dry areas of the foothills and mountains of California, often in chaparral communities.

Description

Growth pattern
Its branches are incised and muscular in appearance from the side. In cross section they appear lobed.

Common shrub associates within the chaparral community include toyon.

Leaves and stems 
The leaves are distinctive in that they have smooth edges from the base to about half way up, then are wavy or toothed to the rounded tip.

Betula is the birch genus, and the species name refers to the birch-like leaves.

Inflorescence and fruit
The white flowers are small, clustered, and mildly scented, similar to acacia.

The fruit is a tubular achene with the long, plumelike flower style still attached.

The genus name comes from the Greek kerkos ("tail"), referring to the tail-like appearance of the fruit; and carpus ("fruit"), thus, "fruit with tail".

Taxonomy
Varieties
There are three varieties:
Cercocarpus betuloides var. betuloides, rangewide
Cercocarpus betuloides var. blancheae – Catalina mahogany, island mountain mahogany, limited to California, especially the Channel Islands
Cercocarpus betuloides var. macrourus – few flowered mountain mahogany, California and Oregon

Cercocarpus betuloides is sometimes treated as a part of Cercocarpus montanus, var. glaber in particular.

Uses
Deer, cattle and sheep browse the plant.

The reddish  wood of the shrub is very hard and was traditionally used by the indigenous peoples of California to make arrow tips, fishing spears, and digging sticks.

Cercocarpus betuloides is cultivated as an ornamental plant by specialty nurseries for planting in native plant, drought tolerant, and wildlife gardens; and in designed natural landscaping projects and habitat restoration programs.

References

External links

Jepson Manual Treatment — Cercocarpus betuloides
Calflora taxon report, University of California: Cercocarpus betuloides (Mountain mahogany,  birch leaf mountain mahogany)
United States Department of Agriculture Plants Profile for Cercocarpus montanus var. glaber (birchleaf mountain mahogany)
 Cercocarpus betuloides — Calphotos Photo gallery, University of California

betuloides
Flora of Baja California
Flora of the Western United States
Natural history of the California chaparral and woodlands
Flora of the Cascade Range
Flora of the Klamath Mountains
Flora of the Sierra Nevada (United States)
Natural history of the California Coast Ranges
Natural history of the Channel Islands of California
Natural history of the Peninsular Ranges
Natural history of the San Francisco Bay Area
Natural history of the Santa Monica Mountains
Natural history of the Transverse Ranges
Plants described in 1840
Drought-tolerant plants
Garden plants of North America
Flora without expected TNC conservation status